Hours of Light aka Light Hours is a 2004 Spanish romance and prison drama film directed by  which stars Alberto San Juan and Emma Suárez.

Plot 

Cast

Production 
A Sogecine and La Fiesta production, the film had the participation of TVE, Telemadrid, and Canal+. Shooting began on 2 June 2003 and lasted for 8 weeks. The former Hospital Militar del Generalísimo in Calle de Isaac Peral (Madrid) stood in for indoor prison settings. Some outdoor scenes were shot in Leganés.

Release 
The film premiered in competition at the 52nd San Sebastián International Film Festival in September 2004. It was met by a chilly reception by the festival audience. Distributed by Warner Sogefilms, it was theatrically released in Spain on 24 September 2004.

Reception 
Jonathan Holland of Variety considered that despite its commendable intentions, the film is "hampered by its script's inability to follow through the logic of its premise to the emotionally satisfying conclusion it merits".

Casimiro Torreiro of El País considered the film to be both a discourse about remorse and a bet for social rehabilitation.

Accolades 

|-
| rowspan = "2" align = "center" | 2005 || rowspan = "2" | 19th Goya Awards || Best Original Screenplay || José Ángel Esteban, Manolo Matji, Carlos López ||  || rowspan = "2" | 
|-
| Best Editing || José María Biurrun ||  
|}

See also 
 List of Spanish films of 2004

References 

Films set in 1987
Films set in 1991
Spanish prison films
2000s prison drama films
2000s Spanish films
2000s Spanish-language films
Sogecine films
2004 romantic drama films
Spanish romantic drama films
Films shot in Madrid
Films set in Spain
Films shot in the Community of Madrid